is a Japanese footballer who plays for Avispa Fukuoka.

His younger brother Takayuki is also a professional footballer currently playing for J2 League side Renofa Yamaguchi FC.

Club statistics
Updated to 21 July 2022.

References

External links
Profile at Mito HollyHock

Profile at Consadole Sapporo

1995 births
Living people
Association football people from Hokkaido
Japanese footballers
J1 League players
J2 League players
J3 League players
Hokkaido Consadole Sapporo players
Hiroyuki Mae
J.League U-22 Selection players
Mito HollyHock players
Avispa Fukuoka players
Association football midfielders
Sportspeople from Sapporo